Clésio Palmirim David Baúque (born 11 October 1994), known simply as Clésio, is a Mozambican professional footballer who plays as a forward in Finland for Honka and Mozambique national team.

Club career

Benfica
Born in Maputo, Clésio started with Ferroviário and after becoming the top scorer of Moçambola with 6 goals, he signed for Benfica in September 2012, joining the Portuguese club in January 2013. Before joining Benfica, he claimed to be inspired to follow in the footsteps of Eusébio. He was assigned to the under-19 side, playing nine matches and scoring twice.

On 14 March 2014, Clésio was loaned to American club Harrisburg City Islanders, a team competing in the United Soccer League, the third tier of the United States soccer league system. He made his debut on 6 April, in an away draw against the Wilmington Hammerheads, and scored his first goal on 17 May, bagging a double within five minutes to give the City Islanders the lead over Dayton Dutch Lions. On 12 June, he added another goal and helped his team beat the Pittsburgh Riverhounds, to win their first league game in four match-days. On 24 August, he netted a double in a 2–2 draw with Rochester Rhinos, increasing his goal tally to five. It would be his last match for the City Islanders, having started 9 games in 20 appearances in total throughout their season.

After returning to Benfica, the 20-year old moved to the Benfica B in the Segunda Liga, making his debut on 1 February 2015, replacing Nuno Santos on the 87th minute of a home loss with Leixões. On 24 May 2015, Clésio scored his first goal for Benfica B in a home win against Vitória de Guimarães B. His goal was an individual effort where he dribble past several players and finished in front of Miguel Oliveira. In 2015–16, he remained in the B-team, playing four times in nine match-days. However, after Nélson Semedo injury, Rui Vitória promoted him to the first team and converted him to play right-back against Tondela on 30 October. It would be his sole appearance for the main team, as he was immediately demoted back to the reserves.

Panetolikos
On 30 January 2016, Clésio moved to Panetolikos, penning a three-year deal with the Greek-side. He made his Greek Superleague debut on 8 February 2016 in an away game against Panionios.

Gabala
On 10 July 2019, Clésio signed a one-year contract with Azerbaijani club Gabala.

Zira
On 18 July 2020, Zira announced the signing of Clésio

International
At the youth level he played in the 2013 COSAFA U-20 Cup.

Clésio made his senior international debut for Mozambique on 15 November 2011 against Comoros during the first round of 2014 FIFA World Cup qualification. In the match, he also scored his first international goal, the fourth goal of the 4–1 victory. He was also part of Mozambique's squad during 2013 Africa Cup of Nations qualification.

Career statistics

Club

International goals
Scores and results list Mozambique's goal tally first.

Honours
Benfica
Primeira Liga: 2015–16

References

External links
 Profile at SoccerPunter
 
 
 

1994 births
Sportspeople from Maputo
Living people
Association football forwards
Mozambican footballers
Mozambique under-20 international footballers
Mozambique international footballers
Clube Ferroviário de Maputo footballers
S.L. Benfica B players
S.L. Benfica footballers
Penn FC players
Panetolikos F.C. players
İstanbulspor footballers
Gabala FC players
Zira FK players
C.S. Marítimo players
USL Championship players
Liga Portugal 2 players
Primeira Liga players
Super League Greece players
TFF First League players
Azerbaijan Premier League players
Campeonato de Portugal (league) players
Mozambican expatriate footballers
Expatriate footballers in Portugal
Mozambican expatriate sportspeople in Portugal
Expatriate soccer players in the United States
Mozambican expatriate sportspeople in the United States
Expatriate footballers in Greece
Mozambican expatriate sportspeople in Greece
Expatriate footballers in Turkey
Mozambican expatriate sportspeople in Turkey
Expatriate footballers in Azerbaijan
Mozambican expatriate sportspeople in Azerbaijan